Autumn-Admiring Pavilion or Aiwan Pavilion is a Chinese pavilion on Mount Yuelu, in Yuelu District, Changsha, Hunan. Alongside the Zuiweng Pavilion, Taoran Pavilion and Huxin Pavilion, it is one of the Four Great Pavilions of Jiangnan.

History

And later  (1730–1797), Viceroy of Huguang, changed its name to Autumn-Admiring Pavilion. It is cited from the verses of that "I stop my carriage to admire the maple trees at nightfall, whose frosty leaves are redder than the flowers of early spring." by Tang dynasty (618–907) poet Du Mu (803–852).

When Mao Zedong studied at Hunan First Normal University, he often comes here with his friends, searching of the truth salvaging the country.

During the Second Sino-Japanese War (1937–1945), the pavilion was devastated by the Imperial Japanese Army.

After the establishment of the Communist State in 1952, the government of Hunan reconstructed the pavilion. In 1987, the pavilion was completely restored by the government. The pavilion has been designated among the seventh group of "Major National Historical and Cultural Sites in Hunan" by the State Council of China in 2013.

Architecture
The current Autumn-Admiring Pavilion is of pure stone structure. The roof is covered with green glazed tiles. It has two layers of overhanging eaves, eight granite hypostyle columns in the pavilion. Right above the pavilion, there is a big caissons. In the center of the second floor of the pavilion is a red stele, on which there are the words "Autumn-Admiring Pavilion", written by Mao Zedong in 1952.  The stone is engraved with a couplet in Chinese characters: "".

Acer palmatum in autumn is a major attraction of Autumn-Admiring Pavilion.

References

Bibliography
 

Pavilions
Buildings and structures in Changsha
Tourist attractions in Changsha
Yuelu District
Major National Historical and Cultural Sites in Hunan